The League of Communists of Montenegro (SKCG) was the Montenegrin branch of the League of Communists of Yugoslavia, the sole legal party of Yugoslavia from 1945 to 1990. Under a 1974 SFR Yugoslavia constitution, greater powers were devolved to the various republic level branches.

History
The league was originally known as the Communist Party of Montenegro  (KPCG). In 1952, the Communist Party of Montenegro was renamed the League of Communists of Montenegro in line with the party's name change on the Yugoslav federal level.

Dissolution
During the early 1990s, the collapse of communism and growing ethnic tensions between the Yugoslav republics led to the federal party's breakup.

On June 22, 1991, the League's Montenegrin branch formally dissolved and its direct successor became the newly created Democratic Party of Socialists (DPS). In essence, the new party continued right where the old one left off, as its entire membership stayed the same. The new party is widely accused of involvement in tobacco smuggling and organized crime

Party leaders 

Blažo Jovanović (May 1943 - 29 June 1963) (b. 1907 - d.1976)
Đorđije Pajković (29 June 1963 - 14 December 1968) (b. 1917 - d.1980)
Veselin Đuranović (14 December 1968 - 21 March 1977) (b. 1925 - d.1997)
 (21 March 1977 - 1 July 1982) (b. 1934)
Dobroslav Ćulafić (1 July 1982 - May 1984) (b. 1926 - d.2011)
Vidoje Žarković (May 1984 - 30 July 1984) (b. 1927 - d.2000)
Marko Orlandić (30 July 1984 - May 1986) (b. 1930 - d.2019)
Miljan Radović (May 1986 - 11 January 1989) (b. 1933 - 2015)
Veselin Vukotić (acting; 11 January 1989 - 26 April 1989) (b. 1949)
Milica Pejanović-Đurišić (26 April 1989 - 28 April 1989) (b. 1959)
Momir Bulatović (28 April 1989 - 4 February 1990) (b. 1956 - 2019)

New party
A new League of Communists of Montenegro was founded in 1993. Later that group united with other communist groups to form the League of Communists of Yugoslavia - Communists of Montenegro which got 2,343 (0.69%) votes in 2006 elections and 1,595 (0.49%) votes in 2009 elections.
In 2009, this party merged with the 'Yugoslav Communists of Montenegro to form the Yugoslav Communist Party of Montenegro, a non-parliamentary party which managed to obtain 1 seat in the Plužine Municipal Assembly.

See also
History of Montenegro
League of Communists of Yugoslavia
League of Communists of Bosnia and Herzegovina
League of Communists of Croatia
League of Communists of Macedonia
League of Communists of Serbia
League of Communists of Vojvodina
League of Communists of Kosovo
League of Communists of Slovenia
List of leaders of communist Yugoslavia
Socialist Federal Republic of Yugoslavia

References

Communist parties in Montenegro
Political parties established in 1943
Political parties disestablished in 1991
Parties of one-party systems
Defunct political parties in Montenegro
League of Communists of Yugoslavia